Bed of Rose's is the fourth studio album by the Statler Brothers and the first one recorded for Mercury Records. One of two singles from the album, "Bed of Rose's" reached #9 on the Billboard Hot Country Singles chart.

Appearances in other media
The songs "Bed of Rose's" and "New York City" appear in the Grand Theft Auto: San Andreas video game soundtrack, on the fictitious radio station K-Rose.

Track listing
"Bed of Rose's" (Harold Reid)
 "New York City" (Don Reid)
 "All I Have to Offer You (Is Me)" (Dallas Frazier, A.L. "Doodle" Owens)
 "Neighborhood Girl"
 "Fifteen Years Ago" (Raymond Smith)
 "The Junkie's Prayer" (Lew DeWitt)
 "We"
 "This Part of the World"
 "Tomorrow Never Comes"
 "Me and Bobby McGee" (Kris Kristofferson, Fred Foster)
 "The Last Goodbye" (Phil Balsley, L. DeWitt, D. Reid, H. Reid)

References

External links
 Statler Discography

1970 albums
Mercury Records albums
The Statler Brothers albums
Albums produced by Jerry Kennedy